Isla Talcan Airport  is an airstrip serving Isla Talcan, an island in the Gulf of Corcovado, in the Los Lagos Region of Chile.

The airstrip is on an isthmus connecting the east and west sections of the island. Approach and departure to either end of the runway are over the water.

See also

Transport in Chile
List of airports in Chile

References

External links
OpenStreetMap - Isla Talcan
OurAirports - Isla Talcan
FallingRain - Isla Talcan Airport

Airports in Chiloé Archipelago